Cyborg Justice is a side-scrolling beat 'em up video game developed by Novotrade and published in 1993 for the Sega Genesis.

Plot
The game's opening cinematic shows a spaceship crashing onto a mining colony. The ship's occupant dies shortly after the crash. The space-traveler's brain is saved and it is transplanted into cyborg body. His memory is erased so that he can be put to work. The memory wipe fails and the player, as the unwilling cyborg, must escape.

Gameplay
When starting the game, players are prompted to select an arm, body, and legs for their cyborg character. Enemies are also a combination of these three types of cyborg parts, even having the secondary arm mixed. When players choose the "two players game mode," players will be prompted to the customization room, and afterwards either go to the main adventure mode or the duel mode if they previously set it in the Options menu. The first player has a combination of metallic gray and yellow, while the second player has a combination of metallic green and purple.

Enemies come in pairs, with first and second player colors respectively. Players have a wide variety of moves, which includes picking up and using objects and manipulating enemies, grabbing the enemy's arm and removing it, and swap it for the current arm, and if the enemy does not have a primary arm, then the next thing the player can grab is the body and tear the enemy in half, which can then be drained to replenish energy.

As the levels progress, the player is confronted with cyborg enemies sporting different modified bodies. If desired, the player can swap out parts from defeated enemies by kicking the wreckage and grasping downward at the displayed item. This is sometimes needed, such as in the first level where the player is faced with an enemy with high-jump legs and then has to jump across a wide chasm. Later on, battles with enemies become increasingly difficult. The more powerful weapons from defeated enemies prove essential in defeating the next wave of foes or end-level bosses.

In easy mode, there are 3 stages, and 3 levels of each stage, and a boss at the 3rd level of each stage. In stage 1, the player finds themselves turned into a cyborg after their space ship crashed, but their memory erasure had failed, causing the player to become a rebel cyborg, fighting for freedom and to destroy whoever turned the player into a cyborg. Stage 1 is the outskirts of the planet, with sparse civilization. On the 3rd level of stage 1, there is a boss that the player must defeat in order to progress to the next stage. Once beaten, the player progresses to stage 2, level 1. In stage 2, the player finds themselves inside of a building, and must fight through all 3 levels of stage 2 to progress to stage 3. In stage 3, the player finds themselves in an industrial setting. In easy mode, when the player defeats the boss in stage 3, level 3, the player wins the game. Each level of each stage is a different color of the one previous. This was one of the main problems with this game, as people criticize its repetitive maps. 

In brutal mode, the hardest possible difficulty, there are 5 stages, and the "Main Boss." Stages 1-3 are the same as stages 1-3 in easy mode, except the enemy cyborgs that the player must fight are stronger. In stage 4, the player finds themselves on a futuristic space-station, where they must battle through all 3 levels of stage 4 to progress to stage 5. In stage 5, the player finds themselves in an eerie cave with sparse technology. There is no boss at the end of the third level of stage 5. Instead, the player progresses to another stage that consists of 1 level. This is the "Main Boss." The player finds themselves in the lair of the Brainiac, a giant brain that the player must defeat to win the game. To defeat the Brainiac, the player must destroy all 3 modules located on the front of the brain, while dodging the array of lasers that return every 2 seconds. When the lasers return, a portion of the lasers fire, leaving little room for the player to avoid getting hit. after the lasers shoot, they slide off screen, and the player is able to hit the Brainiac once more. When the Brainiac is defeated, the player officially "Wins" the game, and the credits are shown. At the end of the credits, the player is asked to input their name, where their score will be displayed.

Enemy cyborgs appear in pairs of two. The first cyborg is always in front of the player, at the top of the fighting zone. Then a second cyborg appears behind the player, at the bottom of the fighting zone. This fighting aspect of the game does not change. The player must defeat both cyborgs to move forward, where the player must defeat 2 more. At the end of a stage without a boss, the player's hovering vehicle swoops in, and the player jumps in and flies off screen, then the player's level points are rewarded and they progress to the next level of the current stage. When the player kills another cyborg, it takes 5 seconds for them to explode, so the player can move forward. The player can also crouch, and hit the corpse to make it explode faster. The player can also low-kick the body, forcing the legs up. the player can then switch legs. The player can also remove other cyborgs' arms, during a fight. The player cannot perform this move to any bosses, except for the stage 1 boss. Torsos cannot be switched, as the torso hold the player's human brain.

Ending

At the end of the game, when the player defeats the Brainiac, the scene changes, and the player finds themselves in the same area where they were forced to comply with orders at the start of the game. The cyborgs then give the player praise for "freeing" them, and offer the player to be their leader. The Cyborgs tell the player that they need good leadership so that they don't get enslaved again.

Special Moves

Some fighting moves are unique to a specific body part. At the start of the game, the player is able to choose their Torso, primary arm, and legs. Available Arms: Cannon Arm, Flamethrower Arm, Saw Arm, Regular Arm. The player cannot change their other arm. The cannon arm can shoot, the flamethrower spews fire, the saw arm can cut, and the regular arm will just punch. Torsos do not give any extra fighting moves, but they do offer speed and health bonuses. There are multiple legs to choose from. The Pneumatic Legs, the Summersault Legs, the Big Legs, and the Tank Legs give special bonuses. the pneumatic legs offer greater kicking power, the summersault legs increase agility and enable the player to summersault, the big legs are immune to floor traps, and the tank legs allow the player to transform their legs into tank tracks, and "dash." The tank legs will hurt enemies if they come in contact with the player while they're "Dashing." There are multiple arms that the player can only acquire by taking them off enemies, such as the missile arm, The piston arm, and more. The player can also jump onto enemies and perform a move that drains health from the enemy and heals the player.

External links

1993 video games
Sega beat 'em ups
Cooperative video games
Multiplayer and single-player video games
Sega Genesis-only games
Sega Genesis games
Video games developed in Hungary
Side-scrolling beat 'em ups